Joen Steensen Bille (born 11 April 1944 in Frederiksberg) is a Danish actor. He is a member of the noble Bille family, and is also a great-grandson of Henrik Ibsen and Bjørnstjerne Bjørnson. He is the son of Irene Ibsen and grandson of Norwegian Prime Minister Sigurd Ibsen. He is married to art historian Bente Scavenius and is the father of actress Beate Bille.

Joen Bille has been a theatre actor in Denmark since the early 1970s, and has had roles in a number of TV series.

Filmography
 Mazurka på sengekanten as Torben, 1970
 Pigen og drømmeslottet as Bruno Børgesen, 1974
 Blind makker, 1976
 Kassen stemmer as Bent, 1976
 Carmen og Babyface, 1995
 Kun en pige, 1995

References

External links

1944 births
Living people
Danish male stage actors
20th-century Danish nobility
21st-century Danish nobility
Ibsen family
Danish male television actors
People from Frederiksberg
Bille family